Ryan James Gilligan (born 18 January 1987) is an English footballer who plays as an attacking midfielder.

Personal life
Gilligan's father, Jimmy Gilligan, was also a professional footballer and is the current head coach of the Nike Football Academy. He started his career at Watford just like Ryan and played most notably for the Welsh clubs Cardiff City and Swansea City.

Career
Born in Swindon, Wiltshire, Gilligan joined the Watford Academy at the age of 16 before Northampton Town took over the third year of his scholarship in August 2005 after being tracked by then manager Colin Calderwood. In his first professional season, Gilligan was used mostly as a striker from the bench. He did however score four goals in part of the promotion side that finished second in League Two. The next season was a poor one as he couldn't score in twenty-five appearances.

For the 2007–08 season, Gilligan moved into midfield where he has looked to have found his natural position, here he played regularly in the first-team scoring four goals in 28 starts. At the end of the season, he signed a new contract keeping him at Northampton until the end of the 2009–10 season. Things went well for Gilligan in the 2008–09 season even though he only had a return of three goals in 31 games, he was described as an "integral part of the team".

Gillgan was later involved in Northampton Town's relegation to League Two. He then had much more productive season during 2009–10, scoring 11 goals and eight assists from midfield as Northampton narrowly missed a spot in the League Two playoffs, he was made captain for the last five games of the season and signed a new two-year contract in May 2010.

On 10 February 2010, Gilligan was loaned out to Torquay United, on a one-month loan as they chased promotion from League Two. He spent a month at the club, making six appearances and had an impact with back to back wins later leading to Torquay finishing seventh ensuring their place in the League Two Playoffs

Gilligan signed on loan for Newport County on 18 August 2011, with a view to a permanent move. His father also had a brief spell on loan at Newport County. However, Ryan returned to the Northampton after his loan spell was completed.

Upon expiry of his contract at Northampton Town in 2012, Ryan joined Swedish club Östersunds FK, managed by ex English Footballer Graham Potter . Within his first season at the club had their highest ever finish in history as they won promotion to the Superettan. Upon conclusion of the season in December 2012, Ryan extended his stay at ÖFK by signing a 6-month contract extension.

After spending 12 months at ÖFK and upon expiry of his contract, Ryan opted to leave the club signing for Borlänge based club IK Brage for a period of up to 2.5 years. With IK Brage going into administration, Gilligan opted to leave and signed a contract with local rivals Dalkurd FF, this proved to be a very good move. Considered the best central midfielder of the 2014 season Gilligan was crucial in the teams playing style. At the end of the season he decided to move back to the north of Sweden and sign with Umea FC a club that had been keen on Ryan for several years. It also gave him the opportunity to work with Johan Sandhal who Gilligan openly praised on several occasions. he wears the number 10 jersey

On 1 April 2017, Gilligan left PS Kemi, joining TP-47 on 19 April 2017, on a one-year contract with the option of an additional year. In June 2018, he took over some of the coaching responsibilities at the club after they sacked manager Aleksey Zhukov.

Career statistics

References

External links
Ryan Gilligan player profile at ntfc.co.uk
 

1987 births
Sportspeople from Swindon
Living people
English footballers
Association football midfielders
Watford F.C. players
Northampton Town F.C. players
Torquay United F.C. players
Newport County A.F.C. players
Östersunds FK players
IK Brage players
Dalkurd FF players
Umeå FC players
Kemi City F.C. players
English Football League players
National League (English football) players
Superettan players
Veikkausliiga players
English expatriate footballers
Expatriate footballers in Sweden
English expatriate sportspeople in Sweden
Expatriate footballers in Finland
English expatriate sportspeople in Finland
TP-47 players